The Eau Gallie Historic District is a historic district in Eau Gallie, Florida. It contains several old buildings. It also contains the Eau Gallie Arts District.

Advent Christian Church

The Advent Christian Church is a U.S. church building located at 1598 Highland Avenue, Eau Gallie, Florida.  The original building was constructed in 1914 and a new building was constructed between 1946 and 1948 using a majority of the materials from the old church.  The church congregation initially formed on October 10, 1910 as the Second Advent Church.  Reverend H. V. Skipper organized the church and it contained 30 members by the time the church was built, including several families of the area.

Ginter Building

The Ginter Building is a historic U.S. building located at 1540 Highland Avenue, Eau Gallie, Florida.  The building was constructed in 1926 by Clifford Ginter.  Over the years, it was used as an apartment building, a rescue mission house, a store, professional offices, and a nursery school.

Karrick Building

The Karrick Building is a historic U.S. building located at 1490 Highland Avenue, Eau Gallie, Florida.  The building was constructed in 1924 by Jesse Karrick and it was used as a general merchandise and grocery store until 1963.  Jesse Karrick was the first proprietor of the store and also served as the first fire chief of Eau Gallie.

Old Eau Gallie Post Office
See Old Eau Gallie Post Office.

James Wadsworth Rossetter House
See James Wadsworth Rossetter House

Winchester Symphony House
See Winchester Symphony House

Roesch House
See Roesch House

Foosaner Art Museum
See Foosaner Art Museum

Houston Pioneer Cemetery
See Houston Pioneer Cemetery

Rossetter Park
See Rossetter Park

Eau Gallie Arts District
The Eau Gallie Arts District is now a non-accredited Florida Main Street Program, a program administered by the Division of Historical Resources at the Florida Department of State. On June 18, 2020, it received its 10th year of accreditation as a Florida Main Street America, a recognition by the National Main Street Program.

Notes

Geography of Brevard County, Florida
Historic districts in Florida
Arts districts